There are two municipalities called Bruckberg in Bavaria, Germany:

Bruckberg, Lower Bavaria, a municipality in the district of Landshut 
Bruckberg, Middle Franconia, a municipality in the district of Ansbach

Bruckberg is also the name of one of the townships of the city Zell am See in Lower Austria, Austria.